William McDaniel Ohman (born August 13, 1977) is a German–born American former professional baseball pitcher. He attended Ponderosa High school in Parker, Colorado. He played in Major League Baseball (MLB) for the Chicago Cubs, Atlanta Braves, Los Angeles Dodgers, Baltimore Orioles, Florida Marlins and Chicago White Sox. In January 2018, Ohman was named the pitching coach for the Palm Beach Cardinals.

College career
He played for Pepperdine University in the late 1990s, where he met his wife.

Professional career

Chicago Cubs
Ohman was selected in the eighth round of the 1998 MLB draft by the Chicago Cubs. He spent all of 1998 and 1999 in the Cubs minor league system.

Ohman made his major league debut on September 19,  against the Milwaukee Brewers, pitching one scoreless inning of relief. In , he pitched for the minor league Iowa Cubs and in the following off-season, he was added to the Major League 40 man roster. On April 26, he was called up from the minors and on the same day, made his major league first pitching appearance since 2001. Ohman also recorded the Opening Day win for the Cubs on April 2, .

Atlanta Braves

On December 4, 2007, Ohman was traded along with Omar Infante to the Atlanta Braves for José Ascanio. With Atlanta, Ohman enjoyed a successful season out of the Braves' bullpen, appearing in 83 games. He finished the season as one of the team's most successful relievers, with a record of 4-1 and an ERA of 3.68. He became a free agent at the conclusion of the season.

Los Angeles Dodgers
On March 30, 2009, Ohman signed a minor league contract with the Los Angeles Dodgers, and made the club out of spring training as a situational left-handed reliever.

However, Ohman only made 21 appearances with the Dodgers in 2009 and spent the last four months of the season on the disabled list after suffering a shoulder injury. The Dodgers declined his option on October 16 and he became a free agent.

Baltimore Orioles
Ohman was invited to the Orioles camp as a non-roster invitee. He made the team on April 3, 2010. He appeared in 51 games for the Orioles, with a 3.30 ERA.

Florida Marlins
On July 31, 2010, Ohman was dealt to the Florida Marlins in exchange for Rick VandenHurk. He appeared in 17 games for the Marlins, with a 3.00 ERA.

Chicago White Sox
On January 8, 2011, Ohman agreed to a 2-year, $4 million contract with the Chicago White Sox. He appeared in 59 games in 2011, with a 4.22 ERA. On June 28, 2012, Ohman was designated for assignment after appearing in 32 games with a record of 0-2 and an ERA of 6.41. He was released on July 3.

Cincinnati Reds
Ohman signed with the Cincinnati Reds on July 21, and was assigned to the Triple-A Louisville Bats.

Washington Nationals
Ohman signed a minor league contract with the Washington Nationals on February 11, 2013.  He was released on March 9, 2013.

Coaching career
Ohman was named the pitching coach for the Palm Beach Cardinals in 2018.

Pitching style
Ohman's repertoire consisted mainly of four-seam and two-seam fastballs around 88–91 mph, as well as a slider at 79–82. He threw a handful of curveballs and changeups. Half of his pitches with two strikes were sliders.

References

External links

1977 births
Living people
Albuquerque Isotopes players
American expatriates in West Germany
American people of Finnish descent
Atlanta Braves players
Baltimore Orioles players
Chicago Cubs players
Chicago White Sox players
Daytona Cubs players
Florida Marlins players
Inland Empire 66ers of San Bernardino players
Iowa Cubs players
Los Angeles Dodgers players
Louisville Bats players
Major League Baseball pitchers
Major League Baseball players from Germany
Minor league baseball coaches
Pepperdine Waves baseball players
Rockford Cubbies players
Sportspeople from Frankfurt
West Tennessee Diamond Jaxx players
Williamsport Cubs players